The canton of Bologne is an administrative division of the Haute-Marne department, northeastern France. It was created at the French canton reorganisation which came into effect in March 2015. Its seat is in Bologne.

It consists of the following communes:
 
Andelot-Blancheville
Annéville-la-Prairie
Bologne
Bourdons-sur-Rognon
Briaucourt
Cerisières
Chantraines
Cirey-lès-Mareilles
Consigny
Daillancourt
Darmannes
Domremy-Landéville
Doulaincourt-Saucourt
Ecot-la-Combe
Froncles
La Genevroye
Guindrecourt-sur-Blaise
Lamancine
Marbéville
Mareilles
Meures
Mirbel
Montot-sur-Rognon
Ormoy-lès-Sexfontaines
Oudincourt
Reynel
Rimaucourt
Rochefort-sur-la-Côte
Roches-Bettaincourt
Rouécourt
Sexfontaines
Signéville
Soncourt-sur-Marne
Viéville
Vignes-la-Côte
Vignory
Vouécourt
Vraincourt

References

Cantons of Haute-Marne